Edwin DeHaven Steel Jr. (May 7, 1904 – July 26, 1986) was a United States district judge of the United States District Court for the District of Delaware.

Education and career

Born in Philadelphia, Pennsylvania, Steel received an Artium Baccalaureus degree from Dartmouth College in 1926. He received a Bachelor of Laws from Yale Law School in 1931. He was in private practice in Wilmington, Delaware from 1931 to 1958. He was general counsel for War Materials, Inc. in 1942.

Federal judicial service

Steel was nominated by President Dwight D. Eisenhower on March 26, 1958, to a seat on the United States District Court for the District of Delaware vacated by Judge Paul Conway Leahy. He was confirmed by the United States Senate on April 22, 1958, and received his commission on April 23, 1958. He assumed senior status due to a certified disability on December 30, 1969. Steel served in that capacity until his death on July 26, 1986.

References

Sources
 

1904 births
1986 deaths
Judges of the United States District Court for the District of Delaware
United States district court judges appointed by Dwight D. Eisenhower
20th-century American judges
20th-century American lawyers
Lawyers from Philadelphia
Dartmouth College alumni
Yale Law School alumni